Grand Island Public Schools (GIPS) is a public school district located in the city of Grand Island, Nebraska, United States. The district serves all of Grand Island. The school district has one high school, three middle schools, and fourteen elementary schools. The district also operates a preschool.

GIPS's superintendent is Mr. Matthew Fisher (Interim Superintendent as of 2/1/23).

Enrollment
GIPS houses 9,920 students as of 2020–21 school year.

Schools
The district houses fourteen elementary schools: Dodge, Engleman, Gates, Howard, Jefferson, Knickrehm, Lincoln, Newell, Seedling Mile, Shoemaker, Starr, Stolley Park, Wasmer, and West Lawn. It also has a preschool, Early Learning Center, for children aged 3–5.

The three middle schools are Barr, Walnut, and Westridge.

The high school is Grand Island Senior High School or GISH.

High schools

Middle schools

Elementary schools

Alternative or specialized schools

References

External links
 

Grand Island, Nebraska
School districts in Nebraska
Education in Hall County, Nebraska
School districts established in 1867
1867 establishments in Nebraska